Cladiella elegantissima is a species of soft corals in the genus Cladiella from New Caledonia.

References

External links 

 
 

Alcyoniidae
Animals described in 1899